Van Asperen is a Dutch surname meaning "from Asperen". It may refer to:

Aart van Asperen (b. 1956), Dutch television director
Bob van Asperen (b. 1947), Dutch harpsichordist
Eelco van Asperen (1965-2013), Dutch computer scientist
Gerrit Verdooren van Asperen (1757-1824), Dutch naval officer

Dutch-language surnames
Surnames of Dutch origin